Catherine Trautmann (born 15 January 1951 in Strasbourg) is a French politician for the French Socialist Party. She served as Minister of Culture of France in the Lionel Jospin cabinet 1997–2000 and was a Member of the European Parliament 1989–1997 and 2004–2014.

Career
She studied in Strasbourg, obtaining a master's degree in Protestant theology at the Protestant theological faculty of the University of Strasbourg. She is also a specialist on Coptic language and literature.

She was elected as the first female mayor of Strasbourg in 1989, re-elected in 1995, then defeated in 2001.

In the EP she sat on the Committee on Industry, Research and Energy and was a substitute for the Committee on Culture and Education and also a member of the Delegation for relations with Canada. She was elected from the constituency of East France.

 Master's degree in Protestant theology (1975)
 Member of the Socialist Party national council (1977)
 Member of the Socialist Party national bureau (2000)
 Member of the national bureau of the National Federation of Socialist and Republican Elected Representatives
 Member of Strasbourg Municipal Council (1983)
 Mayor of Strasbourg and Chairwoman of the Strasbourg Urban Community Council (1989–1997 and 2000–2001)
 Member of Strasbourg City Council and Member of the Strasbourg Urban Community Council (since 2001)
 Member of the National Assembly (1986–1988)
 State Secretary for the Elderly and Disabled (1988)
 Minister for Culture and Communications (1997–2000)
 Member of the European Parliament (1989–1997)
 Council of Europe (1987–1988)
 Chairwoman of the Interdepartmental Task Force on Drug addiction (1988–1990)
 Commissioner-General for the Expo International 2004 (2000–2002) (cancelled in 2003)

References

External links
 European Parliament biography

1951 births
Living people
Articles containing video clips
Chevaliers of the Légion d'honneur
French Ministers of Culture
French people of German descent
French Protestants
Government spokespersons of France
Mayors of Strasbourg
MEPs for East France 2004–2009
MEPs for East France 2009–2014
21st-century women MEPs for France
Socialist Party (France) MEPs
Women mayors of places in France
Women government ministers of France